Elfi Zinn ( Rost, born 24 August 1953 in Rathebur) is a German middle distance runner who specialised in the 800 metres.

She won the silver medal at the 1973 European Indoor Championships and the bronze medal at the 1976 Summer Olympics.

In domestic competitions, she represented the sports club SC Neubrandenburg. She became East German indoor champion in 1973 and 1976.

Her personal best time was 1:55.60 minutes, achieved at the 1976 Summer Olympics. This places her third on the German all-time list, only behind Sigrun Wodars and Christine Wachtel.

References

1953 births
Living people
People from Vorpommern-Greifswald
People from Bezirk Neubrandenburg
East German female middle-distance runners
Sportspeople from Mecklenburg-Western Pomerania
Olympic athletes of East Germany
Athletes (track and field) at the 1976 Summer Olympics
Olympic bronze medalists for East Germany
Medalists at the 1976 Summer Olympics
Olympic bronze medalists in athletics (track and field)